Spellbound Pictures Ltd., USA LLC is a film and television production and distribution company founded by Mark McClafferty and Pamela Edwards McClafferty in 1996.

Spellbound Pictures completed a $60,000,000.00, 12 picture deal with Ellipse/Canal +, the French Entertainment giant in 1996 to supply the United Artist Theatre Circuit with a steady flow of family friendly films. It was under this deal that Spellbound Pictures along with Ellipse (France) and Isambard (New Zealand) completed The Climb, starring John Hurt, Gregory Smith, and David Strathairn, which won eight international film festival awards and was released February 26, 1999.

References

External links 
 Spellbound Pictures Ltd., USA LLC

Film production companies of the United States
Television production companies of the United States